Julie Meyers (born 17 August 2000) is a Belgian artistic gymnast and a member of the national team. She represented Belgium at the 2015 European Youth Summer Olympic Festival, and she competed at the 2016 European Championships in the senior category.

References

2000 births
Living people
Belgian female artistic gymnasts
Belgian women gymnasts